Nikola Josimović (born 16 March 1986), is a Serbian futsal player who plays for Kolubara Lazarevac and the Serbia national futsal team.

References

External links
UEFA profile

1986 births
Living people
Futsal goalkeepers
Serbian men's futsal players